José P. Garza is an American lawyer serving as the District Attorney of Travis County, Texas since 2021.

Early life and education 
José Garza was born in Laredo, Texas, and grew up in San Antonio. He graduated from University of Texas in 2001. He later graduated with a J.D. from Catholic University in Washington, D.C.

Career 
He was previously the executive director of the Workers Defense Project from 2015 to 2021 and was the Democratic Party nominee to be Travis County District Attorney. Garza defeated incumbent DA Margaret Moore in the July 2020 runoff for the Democratic Party nomination. Garza began his campaign by advocating for significant changes to drug prosecutions, "On day one, we will end the prosecution of low-level drug offenses here in Travis County." Garza ran on a platform of ending prosecutions for low-level drug possession, holding police officers accountable for misconduct, and pursuing restorative justice. While Garza was the executive director the Workers Defense Project, he worked to pass paid sick-time policies in Austin, Dallas, and San Antonio. He is a member of the Democratic Socialists of America.

References

External links
 Campaign website

American lawyers
Hispanic and Latino American politicians
Living people
Year of birth missing (living people)
Place of birth missing (living people)
Democratic Socialists of America politicians from Texas
Texas Democrats
Texas socialists
District attorneys in Texas
University of Texas alumni
University of Texas at Austin alumni
Texas politicians